Carpiscula bullata is a species of sea snail, a marine gastropod mollusk in the family Ovulidae (the ovulids, cowry allies or false cowries).

References

Ovulidae
Gastropods described in 1848